Derek McGrath (born 21 January 1972 in Dublin) is a retired Irish footballer.

Derek was a midfielder who played for Shamrock Rovers, Bohemians, Waterford United, Kilkenny City and Monaghan United during his career in the League of Ireland.

He signed for Rovers in January 1992 from Brighton & Hove Albion where he had made 6 appearances  and made his debut at Bray Wanderers on 19 January.

McGrath had made one appearance for Brighton in the 1990-91 FA Cup at Anfield.

He scored 7 goals in 27 league appearances as Rovers won the League in 1994. He also made 2 appearances in the 1994-95 UEFA Cup for the Hoops.

He moved to Bohemians in July 1996 and made his debut in a 1996-97 UEFA Cup tie against FC Dinamo Minsk.

He made 4 appearances for Bohs in Europe all in the UEFA Cup.

His father Joe played and managed in the League of Ireland. Derek was managed by his father briefly in 1998 while at Bohs and again at Kilkenny City.

International career

McGrath scored for the Republic of Ireland national under-19 football team in May 1989 in a 1990 UEFA European Under-18 Football Championship qualifier against Malta.

He was sent off in the final qualifier in Bulgaria as Ireland lost but qualified.

Derek was capped nine times by Irish Under 21 team scoring once in October 1992 in a 1994 UEFA European Under-21 Football Championship qualifier.

He also represented his country at U15, U16 and youth level and played at the 1991 FIFA World Youth Championship

Honours
League of Ireland: 1
 Shamrock Rovers 1993/94

References 

1972 births
Living people
Association footballers from Dublin (city)
Republic of Ireland association footballers
Republic of Ireland under-21 international footballers
Republic of Ireland youth international footballers
Brighton & Hove Albion F.C. players
English Football League players
Association football midfielders
League of Ireland players
Shamrock Rovers F.C. players
Bohemian F.C. players
Waterford F.C. players
Kilkenny City A.F.C. players
Monaghan United F.C. players
Glenavon F.C. players
Armagh City F.C. players
NIFL Premiership players
People from Lucan, Dublin
Sportspeople from South Dublin (county)